Asarum hartwegii is a species of wild ginger known by the common name Hartweg's wild ginger.

It is endemic to California, and grows in forest habitat. This is a perennial herb growing from a ginger-scented rhizome which extends vertically deep into the ground. It forms a clump of elaborately white-veined leaves which are heart-shaped to round in shape and coated in curved hairs. Each is borne on a long petiole up to 21 centimeters long. It bears a solitary flower near the ground on a short peduncle. The flower has no petals but three curving, hairy, brownish or maroon sepals which are whitish with red stripes on their inner surfaces. The fruit is a fleshy capsule containing many seeds.

References

External links
Jepson Manual Treatment
USDA Plants Profile
Photo gallery

hartwegii
Flora of California
Flora without expected TNC conservation status